The Art Museum of the University of Memphis (officially known as the Art Museum at the University of Memphis, or simply as AMUM) is located at 3750 Norriswood Avenue in Memphis, Tennessee, USA.  It is the principal art museum of the University of Memphis.  The museum was opened in 1981 as The University Gallery; in 1994 the gallery received its present name.

The museum is open from Monday to Saturday from 9 am until 5 pm, it is closed on University holidays. Admission to the museum is free and there is no charge for tours.

Permanent exhibits
The museum houses several permanent exhibits. One permanent exhibit is the "Egyptian Collection" of antiquities and archaeological artifacts. The first 44 objects of the Egyptian exhibit were purchased from the Museum of Fine Arts in Boston, Massachusetts in 1975. The collection of Egyptian antiquities at the Art Museum of the University of Memphis is the largest collection of its kind in the Southern United States. More objects were added to the collection by donations from individuals or institutions.

The second permanent exhibit is the "African Collection" with art pieces and artifacts on display. In 2009, new objects stemming from a donation are integrated into the collection of African art and artifacts. The third permanent exhibit is the "Works on Paper Collection" which consists of circa 90 prints which were purchased from museums or acquired through donations.

Temporary exhibits
The "ArtLab", "Caseworks" and the "Multimedia Space" as well as two gallery rooms provide space for temporary exhibitions at the museum, ranging from traditionally painted or printed artwork and photography to modern art forms that depend on less traditional methods of presentation, e.g. art videos.

See also
 University of Memphis
 List of museums in Tennessee

References

External links
 Google Maps street view of the Art Museum of the University of Memphis

Art museums and galleries in Tennessee
Museums in Memphis, Tennessee
University of Memphis
University museums in Tennessee
Art museums established in 1981
1981 establishments in Tennessee
Egyptological collections in the United States